A C-clamp or G-clamp or G-cramp  is a type of clamp device typically used to hold a wood or metal workpiece, and  often used in, but are not limited to, carpentry and welding. Often believed that these clamps are called "C" clamps because of their C-shaped frame, or also often called C-clamps or G-clamps because including the screw part, they are shaped like an uppercase letter G. However, in fact, they were originally called a carriage maker's clamp, or Carriage Clamp.

Description
C-clamps or G-clamps are typically made of steel or cast iron, though smaller clamps may be made of pot metal. At the top of the "C," is usually a small flat edge. At the bottom is a threaded hole through which a large threaded screw protrudes. One end of this screw contains a flat edge of similar size to the one at the top of the frame, and the other end usually a small metal bar, perpendicular to the screw itself, which is used to gain leverage when tightening the clamp. When the clamp is completely closed, the flat end of the screw is in contact with the flat end on the frame.  When the clamp is actually used, it is very rare that this occurs. Generally, some other object or objects will be contained between the top and bottom flat edges.

Usage
A G-clamp is used by means of turning the screw through the bottom of the frame until the desired state of pressure or release is reached.  In the case that the clamp is being tightened, this is when the objects being secured are satisfactorily secured between the flat end of the screw and the flat end of the frame. If the clamp is being loosened, this is when a sufficient amount of force is released to allow the secured objects to be moved.

Woodworking
While a G-clamp is a useful tool for woodworking, special care should be taken when working with any woods. The flat gripping edges of the frame, generally no larger than half an inch or a centimeter (depending on the size of the clamp) can cause indentations and marring of the surfaces being clamped. This can be avoided by buffering between the clamp and the timber using two pieces of scrap wood. As each piece of scrap wood is directly in contact with the flat edges of the frame and with the items being clamped, this allows the scrap wood to receive the damage from the clamping, while dispersing the clamping force across the piece of scrap wood into the clamped objects. Deep-throated clamps are also available and provide greater reach for smaller jobs.

Stage Lighting
'' see C-Clamp (stagecraft)

C-clamps are frequently used to hang stage lighting instruments.

See also
 F-clamp

References

Woodworking hand tools
Metalworking hand tools